Léotard is a French surname. Notable people with the surname include:

 Christophe Léotard (born 1966), French chess player
 François Léotard (born 1942), French politician
 Jules Léotard (1838–1870), French acrobat
 Philippe Léotard (1940–2001), French actor

See also 
 Leotard

French-language surnames